Birkenhead Park is a public park in Birkenhead, The Wirral, United Kingdom.

Birkenhead Park may also refer to:
Birkenhead Park railway station, a railway station in Birkenhead, United Kingdom
Birkenhead Park Cricket Club, a cricket club in the UK park
Birkenhead Park FC, a rugby club in Birkenhead, United Kingdom
Birkenhead Park School, a high school near the UK park

See also
Birkenhead Lake Provincial Park, a provincial park in British Columbia, Canada